The 2016 United States Senate election in Arizona was held on November 8, 2016, to elect a member of the U.S. Senate to represent the State of Arizona, concurrently with the 2016 U.S. presidential election, other elections to the U.S. Senate in other states and elections to the U.S. House of Representatives, as well as various state and local elections.

The Democratic primary was held on March 22, 2016, while the Republican primary election took place on August 30, 2016. After serving in the Arizona State Legislature and U.S. House of Representatives for a number of years, Democrat Ann Kirkpatrick sought to unseat incumbent Republican Senator John McCain, who won re-election to his sixth and final term in office.

After hinting in September 2013 that he could retire, McCain subsequently said that the chances he would run again were "pretty good", but his campaign had emphasized that he had not made a decision yet. On April 7, 2015, McCain announced that he would run for re-election. McCain faced strong primary opposition from the Tea Party, but he ultimately defeated challenger Kelli Ward in the August 30 primary.

McCain won with 53.7% of the vote compared to Kirkpatrick's 40.8%, with 5.5% voting for the Green candidate Gary Swing. Although McCain won reelection by double digits, this was the closest margin of his Senate career. It was also his first election in which he failed to win the traditionally Democratic counties of Coconino and Pima. , this was the last time a Republican won the election for a U.S. Senate seat in Arizona. Kirkpatrick would later successfully run again for the U.S. House of Representatives in Arizona's 2nd congressional district in 2018.

Republican primary

John McCain, the 2008 Republican presidential nominee, was re-elected to a fifth term with 59.3% of the vote in 2010. In September 2013 he hinted that he may retire, saying that "[President Obama's] in his last term, I'm probably in mine." When asked if that meant he wouldn't run for re-election, he said "I don't know. I was trying to make a point. I have to decide in about two years so I don't have to make a decision [now]. I don't want to be one of these old guys that should've shoved off." He then said in October 2013 that he was "seriously thinking" about running for re-election. By April 2014 he had held his first fundraiser and acknowledged that "elements on the right" would like to primary him, which he said was "fine with me... you know me: a fight not joined is a fight not enjoyed... I know that I will be very well-prepared." Jennifer Duffy of The Cook Political Report noted that McCain did not fit the profile of a "complacent, long-serving incumbent", saying: "It's not an easy thing to take him on. He is going to be well-prepared, and he has a well-earned reputation for running really tough campaigns. He raises a lot of money and he puts together a good organization."

In September 2014, McCain began having "serious conversations" with state Republicans, local officials and key supporters about running for re-election. He faced a primary challenge in 2010 from former Congressman J. D. Hayworth, who some felt was the weaker opponent. McCain massively outspent and easily defeated him. However, he could face a stronger challenger in 2016. A survey by Public Policy Polling in March 2014 found that McCain was the most unpopular Senator in the country, with 30% of Arizonans approving of him to 54% who disapproved. His unpopularity was bipartisan, with his approvals at 35%–55% with Republicans, 29%–53% with Democrats and 25%–55% with independents. An April 2014 survey by The Polling Company for Citizens United Political Victory Fund found that 64.2% of Republican primary voters favored "a new person" to 29.3% who thought that "Senator McCain deserves to be re-elected to another six-year term." It also found him trailing in match-ups with a generic primary opponent and against specific opponents (see below).

Further compounding matters for McCain was his relationship with the Arizona Republican Party. After his re-election in 2010, McCain adopted more orthodox conservative stances and attitudes and largely opposed actions of the Obama administration. By 2013, however, he had become a key figure in the Senate for negotiating deals on certain issues in an otherwise partisan environment. By early 2014, McCain's apostasies were enough that the Arizona Republican Party formally censured him for having what they saw as a liberal record that had been "disastrous and harmful". The action had no practical effect but showed that McCain's history of being criticized at the state level as insufficiently conservative was still ongoing. Tea Party leaders have said that they are "sick to death" of McCain and will oppose him if he seeks re-election, with one prominent critic of McCain saying that Arizona conservatives were preparing for a "civil war". However, McCain still had a large warchest – $1.7 million as of June 2014 – and would be helped by Arizona state law, which allows independents to vote in the Republican primary.

By early October 2014, McCain was telling reporters that the odds of his running for re-election were "pretty good", saying that whether or not Republicans retake control of the Senate in the 2014 elections would be a factor in his decision-making, "but it certainly wouldn't be the deciding factor." In late October, it was revealed that McCain had scheduled a meeting with supporters two days after the 2014 midterm elections to "discuss my thoughts on my own re-election in 2016." At that meeting, following the Republican takeover of the Senate, he said that he was "seriously considering" and "leaning towards" running for re-election and will make an announcement in early 2015.

In December 2014, Politico reported that McCain and his allies were waging an "aggressive and systematic campaign" to purge the Arizona Republican Party's apparatus of Tea Party and far-right conservatives who hold "obscure, but influential, local party offices" and replace them with McCain loyalists. The Super PAC "Arizona Grassroots Action" was created, which raised almost $300,000 and supported McCain-allied candidates with mailers and automated phone calls, bringing attention to what were previously low-profile and uncontested races. Before August 26, when elections for party offices were held, almost all of the 3,925 precinct committeemen (who vote for local party chairmen, who in turn make decisions on how the party will spend state and local funds, which candidates receive endorsements or funding etc.) were opposed to McCain. After the elections, 1,531 (39%) were regarded as supportive of McCain. Most notably, Timothy Schwartz, who authored the resolution which censured McCain, was ousted. Schwartz attacked McCain for using his "prominence and money and influence" to "ramrod" his critics and former Maricopa County Republican Party Chairman A.J. LaFaro said that McCain was "vindictive" and engaging in the equivalent of "ethnic cleansing".

Tea Party Congressmen Matt Salmon and David Schweikert had been widely regarded as two of the most serious potential challengers to McCain. The pair, who are close friends, agreed that if one of them decided to run against McCain, the other would not do so, to ensure that the anti-McCain vote wouldn't be split between them. Schweikert has acknowledged that he polled the race in 2014 but was considered the less likely of the two to run – he has much less cash-on-hand than Salmon and has admitted that his wife was "not thrilled" at the idea of him running for the Senate. Salmon has since stated that he will not challenge McCain in the primary.

In early February, McCain said that he was "most likely" running for re-election and Club for Growth President David McIntosh said that the organization would "watch closely" the primary race, particularly if Salmon or Schweikert ran, and would "do research and polling and determine if there's a path to victory [against McCain]." Towards the end of February, Salmon and Schweikert began to distance themselves from the race, with State Senator Kelli Ward revealing that she was considering a run.

McCain officially announced on April 7, 2015, that he was running for re-election.

Candidates

Declared
 John McCain, incumbent U.S. Senator
 Clair Van Steenwyk, talk radio host, candidate for U.S. Senate in 2012 and candidate for AZ-08 in 2014
 Kelli Ward, former State Senator

Withdrawn
 Alex Meluskey, printing company owner and FairTax activist
 David Pizer, businessman

Declined
 Jan Brewer, former Governor of Arizona
 Jeff DeWit, State Treasurer of Arizona
 Trent Franks, U.S. Representative
 Paul Gosar, U.S. Representative
 Christine Jones, former Executive Vice President, General Counsel and Corporate Secretary for Go Daddy and candidate for Governor in 2014 (running for AZ-05)
 Martha McSally, U.S. Representative and future U.S. Senator interim appointee for this seat (2019-2020)
 Matt Salmon, U.S. Representative
 David Schweikert, U.S. Representative
 John Shadegg, former U.S. Representative
 Grant Woods, former Arizona Attorney General

Endorsements

Polling

with Jan Brewer

with Christine Jones

with Matt Salmon

with David Schweikert

Generic Republican

Someone more conservative

Results

Democratic primary

Candidates

Declared
 Ann Kirkpatrick, U.S. Representative

Withdrawn
 Leonard Clark, teacher, State House candidate in 2002, 2004, and 2008 and Green Party nominee for AZ-03 in 2010
 Richard Sherzan, retired administrative law judge and former Iowa State Representative

Declined
 Richard Carmona, former Surgeon General and nominee for the U.S. Senate in 2012
 Fred DuVal, former Chairman of the Arizona Board of Regents and nominee for Governor in 2014
 Ruben Gallego, U.S. Representative
 Phil Gordon, former Mayor of Phoenix
 Mark Kelly, retired astronaut and husband of Gabrielle Giffords and future U.S. Senator for this seat
 Janet Napolitano, President of the University of California System, former Secretary of Homeland Security and former Governor of Arizona
 Greg Stanton, Mayor of Phoenix
 Nan Walden, businesswoman, attorney and former chief of staff to Senator Bill Bradley

Endorsements

Results

Green primary

Candidates

Declared
 Gary Swing (write-in)

Results

Libertarian primary

Candidates
 Merissa Hamilton (Write-In)

Results

General election

Debates

Predictions

Polling

with John McCain

with Christine Jones

with Matt Salmon

with David Schweikert

with Kelli Ward

Results

References

External links
Official campaign websites
 John McCain (R) for Senate
 Ann Kirkpatrick (D) for Senate

Arizona
2016
United States Senate
John McCain